IAW may refer to:

 Ice Arena Wales, an ice hockey rink in the Cardiff International Sports Village in Cardiff, Wales
 International Alliance of Women, an international non-governmental organization that works to promote women's human rights
 Iraqi Airways (ICAO designator: IAW), the national carrier of Iraq
 Israeli Apartheid Week, an annual series of university lectures and rallies